D. A. Clarke (also known as De Clarke and DeAnander) is an American radical feminist essayist and activist, notable for her development of feminist theory, and for the anonymous poem privilege.

Career 
Much of Clarke's writing addresses the link between violence against women and market economics, although she may be best known for her 1991 essay "Justice Is A Woman With A Sword". In that essay, which she has updated twice for editions of the anthology Transforming a Rape Culture, she argues that feminist theory has taken a dogmatic approach to nonviolence and that women's self-defense, violent feminist activism, and the encouragement of positive media portrayals of violent women (such as in Kill Bill or Xena: Warrior Princess) have not been given the serious consideration they should receive and that their dismissal from mainstream feminism, while it may ultimately be desirable, has not been based on a properly thorough analysis.  Her most popular work, however, may be the one least often correctly attributed to her:  the early poem privilege, which has been found on dorm refrigerators and bulletin boards ascribed to 'Anonymous.'  In this case, at least, Anonymous really was a woman.

In addition to being published in print anthologies, much of her work has appeared online.  Clarke also had brief visibility as an amateur/indie musician, with one album "messages" released on cassette in the mid 80's.

Selected bibliography

Books 
 
Preview poem: 
  A solo collection of poetry.

Chapters in books 
  Feminist anthology.
 
  Pdf.
See also: 
"Introduction"  to chapter by Diana E. H. Russell pp. 325-327.
"The incredible case of the Stack o' Wheat prints" by Nikki Craft pp. 327-331.
"The rampage against Penthouse" by Melissa Farley pp. 339-345.

Journal articles 
 
 
  (archived at Archive.org)
  (archived at Archive.org)
  (archived at Archive.org)

Essays 
 
 
 
  Pdf.
  (archived at Archive.org)
  (archived at Archive.org)
 See also:  (archived at Archive.org, archive date 4 February 2005)
  (archived at Archive.org)

Interviews
  
A documentary oral history project.

Blogs 
 Feral Scholar Shared blog of Stan Goff and DeAnander (archived at Archive.org)
 Lazy Quote Diary (D.A. Clarke's blog at European Tribune)

References

External links 
 DA Clarke's Personal Homepage

Anti-pornography feminists
Anti-prostitution feminists
Feminist studies scholars
American essayists
American lesbian writers
Living people
Year of birth missing (living people)
American feminist writers
Lesbian feminists
Radical feminists
American women essayists
21st-century American LGBT people
21st-century American women writers